Waldachtal is a municipality in the district of Freudenstadt in Baden-Württemberg in southern Germany.

Fischertechnik GmbH, a manufacturer of construction toys, is based here.

People 
 Artur Fischer (1919–2016), German inventor

References 

Freudenstadt (district)
Württemberg